"Shine" is a song by Australian singer-songwriter Shannon Noll. It was released as the first single from his second studio album, Lift (2005), on 26 September 2005. It debuted at number one on the Australian Singles Chart and earned a platinum sales certification for shipping over 70,000 copies in Australia. In April 2009, the song was released in the United Kingdom, coinciding with Noll's run in the stage version of Jeff Wayne's War of the Worlds.

Track listings
Australian CD single
 "Shine"
 "What Love Is"

UK promo CDR
 "Shine" – 3:34

Credits and personnel
Credits are taken from the Australian CD single liner notes.

Studios
 Mixed at the Ballroom (London, England)
 Mastered at Edensound Mastering (Melbourne, Australia)

Personnel
 Matthew Gerrard – writing, all instruments, production, arrangement
 Andy Stochansky – writing
 Shannon Noll – vocals
 Bryon Jones – vocal production
 Mark Needham – mixing
 Will Brierre – engineering assistant
 Martin Pullan – mastering

Charts

Weekly charts

Year-end charts

Certifications

Release history

References

2005 singles
2005 songs
Number-one singles in Australia
RCA Records singles
Shannon Noll songs
Songs written by Andy Stochansky
Songs written by Matthew Gerrard
Sony BMG singles